Isaac Carrasco Rivas (14 August 1928 – 5 April 2004) was a Chilean footballer. He played in 27 matches for the Chile national football team from 1954 to 1961. He was also part of Chile's squad for the 1956 South American Championship.

Honours

Player
Naval
 : 1951

Colo-Colo
 Primera División: 1956
 Copa Chile: 1958

Manager
Deportes Concepción
 Segunda División: 1967

Lota Schwager
 Segunda División: 1969

Ñublense
 Segunda División: 1976

Trasandino
 Segunda División: 1985

References

External links
 
 Isaac Carrasco at MemoriaWanderers 
 Isaac Carrasco at PartidosdeLaRoja 

1928 births
2004 deaths
People from Valdivia Province
Chilean footballers
Chile international footballers
Naval de Talcahuano footballers
Audax Italiano footballers
Colo-Colo footballers
Santiago Morning footballers
Chilean Primera División players
Association football defenders
Chilean football managers
Santiago Morning managers
Unión La Calera managers
Deportes Concepción (Chile) managers
Unión Española managers
Unión San Felipe managers
Lota Schwager managers
Club Deportivo Palestino managers
O'Higgins F.C. managers
Deportes Naval managers
Ñublense managers
San Marcos de Arica managers
Trasandino de Los Andes managers
Deportes Antofagasta managers
Chile national football team managers
Audax Italiano managers
Magallanes managers
Santiago Wanderers managers
San Luis de Quillota managers
Chilean Primera División managers
Primera B de Chile managers